Dragons were an English rock band, formed in 2005 in Bristol by drummer David Francolini.

Although originally a studio project recorded by Francolini in Francolini's own studio "Ohm Recordings", they toured the album with several other musicians including fellow Dark Star and Levitation members Christian Hayes and Laurence O'Keefe, with original Levitation bassist Joe Allen stepping in to fill in for O'Keefe.

After initial live dates with Francolini's former band mates, the line-up of Adam Coombs (synthesizer), Calvin Talbot (guitar), Will Crewdson (guitar) and Jim Fage (bass) was settled. Their brand of sweeping indie rock is compared to the sound of bands such as Joy Division and Editors. Their debut album, Here are the Roses, was released in June 2007. A follow up album was recorded with the full band line-up, but remains unmixed and unreleased.

Albums

References

External links
 MySpace site
 Gig review by Jackie Hitchen at BBC Leeds
 Interview with Ned Netherwood at alive.co.uk
 Review by Fiona Jerome of Here are the Roses at Musicohm.com

English rock music groups
Musical groups from Bristol